State Route 194 (SR-194) is a state highway in northern Utah County, Utah, in the United States that runs along 2100 North in Lehi and connects SR-68 (Redwood Road) with Interstate 15 and U.S. Route 89. The route is a part of the greater Mountain View Corridor project.

Route description

SR-194 begins in Lehi at the northbound ramps of I-15 exit 282. From its eastern terminus, the route briefly runs concurrently with northbound US-89 as they swing to the west onto the alignment of 2100 North. The routes promptly arrive at an intersection with State Street and the southbound I-15 on and off-ramps, where US-89 splits to the south on State Street.

Continuing west, SR-194 splits into a divided highway with split intersections at Thanksgiving Way, Triumph Boulevard, 3600 West, and Redwood Road, as well as Texas U-turns immediately west of Triumph Boulevard and on both sides of 3600 West. Just before crossing over the Jordan River the route leaves Lehi and enters unincorporated Utah County. After crossing 3600 West, SR-194 reaches its current western terminus at SR-68 (Redwood Road). In the future, an extension from this intersection will be constructed farther west as part of SR-85 (Mountain View Highway) and will loop to the southwest and end at SR-73 in Saratoga Springs.

History

As part of the Mountain View Corridor project, construction began in 2010 on the western end of 2100 North in Lehi. The new section of roadway ran between I-15/US-89 and Redwood Road, and was completed in September 2011. It was the first road segment of the Mountain View Corridor project to be built and was designated as SR-85.

Later, the primary north–south segment of the corridor was built in Salt Lake County, initially opening in 2012. However, this was also designated SR-85, resulting in two discontinuous segments of SR-85 with an implied concurrency connecting the two pieces. This situation lasted until 2017, when construction was started on the section of the Mountain View Corridor connecting SR-73 with SR-68 at 2100 North. This required a route renumbering, as the segment under construction was also planned to be numbered SR-85. As a result, the Utah State Legislature re-designated the original east–west segment of SR-85 on 2100 North as SR-194.

In 2018 construction began on the I-15 Technology Corridor Project. As part of that project, the interchange between SR-194, I-15, and US-89 was entirely rebuilt and moved slightly to the northwest. During construction, it was temporarily converted to a modified diverging diamond interchange. In addition, the I-15 southbound on-ramp was temporarily moved from its former location southwest of the interchange to a cloverleaf-style ramp on the northwest side of the interchange, and returned to its original location when the project was complete.

Future
Like the rest of the Mountain View Corridor, plans call for SR-194 to be upgraded to a freeway in the future. The freeway lanes will be built in the median of the existing divided highway, and the existing roadways will become one-way frontage roads with slip ramps. The upgrade will provide freeway access between the future SR-85 freeway and I-15. As these additional upgrades are unfunded, no projected completion date has been given.

Major intersections

See also

Notes

References

External links

 Utah Department of Transportation Highway Referencing: Route 194 (PDF)

194
 194
Streets in Utah